Motorcycle Diaries is a Philippine television documentary show broadcast by GMA News TV. Hosted by Jay Taruc, it premiered on July 15, 2011. The show concluded on March 16, 2017.

Premise
The whole concept of the show is Jay Taruc is visiting any areas and provinces in the Philippines by using his motorcycle. Every travel and life he encounters, he wrote some facts and angle of every story about his surroundings using his own diary note.

References

2011 Philippine television series debuts
2017 Philippine television series endings
Filipino-language television shows
GMA News TV original programming
GMA Integrated News and Public Affairs shows
Motorcycle television series
Philippine documentary television series